Boy Meets Boy may refer to:

 Boy Meets Boy (film), a 2008 South Korean short film
 Boy Meets Boy (musical), a 1975 Off-Broadway musical comedy by Bill Solly and Donald Ward
 Boy Meets Boy (novel), a 2003 novel by David Levithan
 Boy Meets Boy (TV series), a 2003 American reality television series

See also 
 "When Boy Meets Boy", a 2013 song by Matt Fishel
 Boy Meets Girl (disambiguation)
 Girl Meets Boy, a 2007 novel